Kennedy Lake is located in Glacier National Park, in the U. S. state of Montana. The lake is in a cirque with Mount Henkel to the south and Crowfeet Mountain to the northwest. The Redgap Pass Trail is the closest maintained trail but does not go to this remote lake.

See also
List of lakes in Glacier County, Montana

References

Lakes of Glacier National Park (U.S.)
Lakes of Glacier County, Montana